The 2015–16 Siena Saints men's basketball team represented Siena College during the 2015–16 NCAA Division I men's basketball season. The Saints, led by third year head coach Jimmy Patsos, played their home games at the Times Union Center, with one exhibition game at Alumni Recreation Center, and were members of the Metro Atlantic Athletic Conference. They finished the season 21–13, 13–7 in MAAC play to finish in third place. They defeated Manhattan in the quarterfinals of the MAAC tournament to advance to semifinals where they lost to Iona. They were invited to the College Basketball Invitational where they lost in the first round to Morehead State.

Roster

Schedule

|-
!colspan=12 style="background:#008000; color:#ffd700;"| Exhibition

|-
!colspan=12 style="background:#008000; color:#ffd700;"| Regular season

|-
!colspan=12 style="background:#008000; color:#ffd700;"| MAAC tournament

|-
!colspan=12 style="background:#008000; color:#ffd700;"| CBI

References

Siena Saints men's basketball seasons
Siena
Siena